Ben Foster may refer to:

Ben Foster (actor) (born 1980), American actor
Ben Foster (footballer) (born 1983), English goalkeeper
Ben Foster (composer) (born 1977), British composer, orchestrator and conductor
Ben Foster (director) (born 1984), American director, editor, producer and composer
Ben Weasel (born Ben Foster, 1968), American author and member of punk rock band Screeching Weasel

See also
Benjamin Forster (disambiguation)